Domovoy is the second-largest crater on Ariel's surface, with a diameter of 71 km. The name comes from a spirit that protects homes in Slavic mythology; this name was approved by the International Astronomical Union in 1988. It was imaged for the first time by the Voyager 2 spacecraft in January 1986.

See also 

 List of geological features on Ariel

References 

Ariel (moon)
Surface features of Uranian moons